The Marsland Formation is a geologic formation in Nebraska. It preserves fossils dating back to the Neogene period.

Fossil content

Mammals

Ungulates

Reptiles

Testudines

See also

 List of fossiliferous stratigraphic units in Nebraska
 Paleontology in Nebraska

References

 

Neogene geology of Nebraska